Tarok may refer to:

 Bavarian Tarok, traditional Bavarian card game played with 36 cards
 Danish Tarok, traditional Danish card game played with 78 tarot cards
 German Tarok, German ancestor of family of American and central European card games played with 36 cards
 Grosstarok, extinct German card game played with 78 tarot cards
 Tapp Tarok, popular Austrian card game of the Tarot family played with 54 cards
 Tarok people, a Nigerian people group

See also 
 Tarock card games